Jelsa is a village in Suldal municipality in Rogaland county, Norway.  The village is located along the inner part of the Boknafjorden, near the mouths of the Sandsfjorden and Erfjorden.  The village is the site of a school, store, gas station, and some small stores.  There was a barrel factory here until it closed in 2009.  Jelsa Church is located in this village.

The village was the administrative centre of the old municipality of Jelsa which existed from 1838 until 1965.

The village lies along Norwegian county road 517, and it is a regular ferry stop on the route from Nedstrand-Hebnes-Foldøy-Jelsa.

References

Villages in Rogaland
Suldal